School education in Croatia is mainly provided by the Ministry of Education of the Croatian Government. The Constitution of Croatia section 65 defines primary and secondary education as mandatory and free.

List of high schools in Croatia
List of high schools in Zagreb

See also

Education in Croatia
List of institutions of higher education in Croatia

 
Croatia
Croatia
Schools
Schools
Schools